Ippolito Berrone is a former racing driver born in Genova, Italy. He entered 13 races between 1933 and 1939 (9 started), of which he won two, in Maseratis, Alfa Romeos and Lancias. Berrone was one of the Maserati brothers' most valued customers so they loaned him an 1100cc works OSCA for a one-off return in 1950 for the Pontedecimo-Giovi hillclimb.

References

Year of birth unknown
Sportspeople from Genoa
Mille Miglia drivers
Italian racing drivers